William Aaron Roberts (born 24 April 1994) is a Welsh footballer. He is a midfielder who last played for Coventry City.

Career
Roberts made his professional debut as a substitute on 27 April 2012 in a 4–0 Championship to Southampton, coming on to replace Gary McSheffrey after 34 minutes. Will was released from the Sky Blues on 15 May 2013.

Career statistics
Stats according to [ Soccerbase]

A.  The "Other" column constitutes appearances and goals (including substitutes) in the Football League Trophy.

References

External links
Will Roberts player profile at ccfc.co.uk

1994 births
Living people
Welsh footballers
Sportspeople from Rhyl
Association football midfielders
Coventry City F.C. players
English Football League players
Wales youth international footballers